Public Sector Undertakings (Banks) are a major type of government owned banks in India, where a majority stake (i.e. more than 50%) is held by the Ministry of Finance of the Government of India or State Ministry of Finance of various State Governments of India. The shares of these government-owned-banks are listed on stock exchanges. Their main objective is social welfare

History

Emergence of public sector banks
The Central Government entered the banking business with the nationalization of the Imperial Bank of India in 1955. A 60% stake was taken by the Reserve Bank of India and the new bank was named State Bank of India. The seven other state banks became subsidiaries of the new bank in 1959 when the State Bank of India (Subsidiary Banks) Act, 1959 was passed by the Union government.

The next major government intervention in banking took place on 19 July 1969 when the Indira government nationalised an additional 14 major banks. The total deposits in the banks nationalised in 1969 amounted to 50 crores. This move increased the presence of nationalised banks in India, with 84% of the total branches coming under government control.

Before the economic liberalisation
The share of the banking sector held by the public banks continued to grow through the 1980s, and by 1991 public sector banks accounted for 90% of the banking sector. A year later, in March, 1992, the combined total of branches held by public sector banks was 60,646 across India, and deposits accounted for ₹1,10,000 crore. The majority of these banks was profitable, with only one out of the 21 public sector banks reporting a loss.

Liberalisation in the 2000s
The nationalised banks reported a combined loss of ₹1160 crores. However, the early 2000s saw a reversal of this trend, such that in 2002-03 a profit of ₹7780 crores by the public sector banks: a trend that continued throughout the decade, with a ₹16856 crore profit in 2008–2009.

Mergers
The consolidation of SBI-associated banks started first by State Bank of India merging its subsidiary State Bank of Saurashtra with itself on 13 August 2008. Thereafter it merged State Bank of Indore with itself on August 27, 2010. The remaining subsidiaries, namely the State Bank of Bikaner & Jaipur, State Bank of Hyderabad, State Bank of Mysore, State Bank of Patiala and State Bank of Travancore, and Bharatiya Mahila Bank were merged with State Bank of India with effect from 1 April 2017.

Vijaya Bank and Dena Bank were merged into Bank of Baroda in 2018. IDBI Bank was categorised as a private bank with effect from January 2019.

On 30 August 2019, Finance Minister Nirmala Sitharaman announced the government's plan for further consolidation of public sector banks: Indian Bank's merger with Allahabad Bank (anchor bank - Indian Bank); Punjab National Bank's merger with Oriental Bank of Commerce and United Bank (anchor bank - Punjab National Bank); Union Bank of India's merger with Andhra Bank and Corporation Bank (anchor bank - Union Bank of India); and Canara Bank's merger with Syndicate Bank (anchor bank - Canara Bank). The mergers took effect from 1 April 2020.

Central Public Sector Undertakings (Banks)

 Nationalized Banks (Government Shareholding %, as at end-March 2022)

 State Bank of India (57.59%)
 Bank of Baroda (63.97%)
 Canara Bank (62.93%)
 Punjab National Bank (73.15%)
 Indian Bank (79.86%)
 Union Bank of India (83.49%)
 Bank of India (81.41%)
 Central Bank of India (93.08%)
 Bank of Maharashtra (90.90%)
 UCO Bank (95.39%)
 Indian Overseas Bank (96.38%)
 Punjab and Sind Bank (98.25%)

Presently there are 43 Regional Rural Banks in India Since 1 April 2020 

Andhra Pradesh

Andhra Pragathi Grameena Bank
Chaitanya Godavari Gramin Bank
Saptagiri Gramin Bank

Arunachal Pradesh	
Arunachal Pradesh Rural Bank

Assam
Assam Gramin Vikash Bank

Bihar
 Dakshin Bihar  
  Gramin Bank
Uttar Bihar Gramin Bank

Chhattisgarh
Chhattisgarh Rajya Gramin Bank

Gujarat
Baroda Gujarat Gramin Bank
Saurashtra Gramin Bank

Haryana
Sarva Haryana Gramin Bank

Himachal Pradesh
Himachal Pradesh Gramin Bank

Jammu and Kashmir
J&K Grameen Bank
Ellaquai Dehati Bank

Jharkhand
Jharkhand Rajya Gramin Bank

Karnataka
Karnataka Gramin Bank 
Karnataka Vikas Grameena Bank

Kerala
Kerala Gramin Bank

Madhya Pradesh
Madhyanchal Gramin Bank
Madhya Pradesh Gramin Bank

Maharashtra
Maharashtra Gramin Bank
Vidharbha Konkan Gramin Bank

Manipur
Manipur Rural Bank

Meghalaya
Meghalaya Rural Bank

Mizoram
Mizoram Rural Bank

Nagaland
Nagaland Rural Bank

Odisha	
Odisha Gramya Bank
Utkal Grameen Bank

Puducherry
Puduvai Bharathiar Grama Bank

Punjab	
Punjab Gramin Bank

Rajasthan	
Baroda Rajasthan Kshetriya Gramin Bank	
Rajasthan Marudhara Gramin Bank

Tamil Nadu
Tamil Nadu Grama Bank

Telangana
Telangana Grameena Bank
Andhra Pradesh Grameena Vikas Bank

Tripura
Tripura Gramin Bank

Uttar Pradesh
Aryavart 
  Bank
Prathama UP  
  Gramin Bank
Baroda UP Bank
Uttarakhand
Uttarakhand Gramin Bank

West Bengal
Paschim Banga Gramin Bank	
Bangiya Gramin Vikash Bank
 Uttarbanga Kshetriya Gramin Bank

See also 
List of banks in India
Banking Frontiers magazine

References

External links
 WEBSITES OF BANKS IN INDIA (rbi.org.in) 
 What are the different types of banks in India

Lists of banks in India
Banks
India government-related lists